John Underwood may refer to:

John Underwood (actor) (fl. 1600–1624), English actor
John Underwood (PR adviser), former Director of Communications for British Labour Party
John William Henderson Underwood (1816–1888), U.S. Representative from Georgia
John C. Underwood (1840–1913), American civil engineer, Lieutenant Governor of Kentucky from 1875 to 1879
John Curtiss Underwood (1809–1873), American lawyer, Abolitionist politician, and federal judge
John Underwood (American football) (1901-1932), played for the Milwaukee Badgers in the 1920s
John W. Underwood, American aviation writer, photographer and historian.